Rhombonotus is a monotypic genus of  jumping spiders containing the single species, Rhombonotus gracilis. It was first described by Ludwig Carl Christian Koch in 1879, and is found only in Queensland. The name is a combination of the Ancient Greek "rhumbo", meaning "rhombus", and "notos", meaning "back". The species name is from Latin gracilis, meaning "slender".

References

Monotypic Salticidae genera
Salticidae
Spiders of Australia
Taxa named by Ludwig Carl Christian Koch